Galina Danchikova (born August 13, 1954, Khairyuzovka, Balagansky District) is a Russian political figure and a deputy of the 8th State Duma. In 2001 she was awarded a Doctor of Sciences degree in economics.

From 1979 to 1989, she was the head of budget and Deputy Head of the Verkhoyansk Regional Financial Department of the Yakut Autonomous Soviet Socialist Republic. In 1991–1992, she served as a Deputy Chairman of the Presidium of the Verkhoyansk District Council, and later she was appointed the deputy head of the administration. From 1993 to 2002, she worked as the first deputy of the acting minister of finance of Yakutia. In 2010, she was appointed the chairman of The Government of the Republic. She left the post as she was elected the deputy of the 7th State Duma from the Sakha constituency. In 2021, she was re-elected for the State Duma of the 8th convocation.

She is one of the members of the State Duma the United States Treasury sanctioned on 24 March 2022 in response to the 2022 Russian invasion of Ukraine.

References

1954 births
Living people
United Russia politicians
21st-century Russian politicians
Eighth convocation members of the State Duma (Russian Federation)
Seventh convocation members of the State Duma (Russian Federation)
Russian individuals subject to the U.S. Department of the Treasury sanctions